Edinakovo is a village in the municipality of Demir Hisar, North Macedonia.

Demographics
Edinakovci is attested in the Ottoman defter of 1467/68 as a village in the vilayet of Manastir. The inhabitants attested primarily bore typical Slavic anthroponyms, while instances of the Albanian name Bardo (Bardhi) also appear.

According to the 2002 census, the village had a total of 338 inhabitants. Ethnic groups in the village include:

Macedonians 337
Other 1

References

Villages in Demir Hisar Municipality